This is a list of Cypriot football transfers for the 2019–20 summer transfer window by club. Only transfers of clubs in the Cypriot First Division and Cypriot Second Division are included.

Cypriot First Division

Note: Flags indicate national team as has been defined under FIFA eligibility rules. Players may hold more than one non-FIFA nationality.

AEK Larnaca

In:

Out:

AEL Limassol

In:

Out:

Anorthosis Famagusta

In:

Out:

APOEL

In:

Out:

Apollon Limassol

In:

Out:

Doxa Katokopias

In:

 

Out:

Enosis Neon Paralimni

In:

Out:

Ethnikos Achna

In:

Out:

Nea Salamis Famagusta

In:

Out:

Olympiakos Nicosia

In:

Out:

Omonia

In:

Out:

Pafos FC

In:

Out:

References

Football transfers summer 2019
Trans
Cypriot football transfers